The Kaiser Foundation is a mental health organization based in Canada. Its stated mission is to assist individuals and communities in preventing and reducing the harm associated with problem substance use and addictive behaviours.  Although founded by a related person, it is not the same organisation as the Kaiser Family Foundation based in the United States. It was founded in 1985 by Edgar Kaiser Jr.

External links
 Kaiser Foundation
 BC Business Online - The Reinvention of Edgar Kaiser Jr. 2010-12-01

Foundations based in Canada
Medical and health foundations
Mental health organizations in Canada